Thomas Lowry Bailey (January 6, 1888 – November 2, 1946) was an American politician from the state of Mississippi.

He was born in Webster County, Mississippi and graduated from Millsaps College. Bailey was elected to the Mississippi House of Representatives as a Democratic candidate in 1915 and served from 1916 to 1940. He unsuccessfully ran for governor in 1939 but was elected in 1943. Bailey helped in the development of roads and ways to help farmers sell their products. During his term a four-year medical school at the University of Mississippi was initiated.

He died of a stroke in Mississippi Governor's Mansion in 1946 aged 58, in Jackson during his term as governor. He was succeeded by Lieutenant Governor Fielding L. Wright.

External links
 Thomas L. Bailey's grave at Find-A-Grave
 Profile at National Governors Association website

1888 births
1946 deaths
People from Webster County, Mississippi
Methodists from Mississippi
Democratic Party governors of Mississippi
Speakers of the Mississippi House of Representatives
Democratic Party members of the Mississippi House of Representatives
20th-century American politicians